Üsküdar Anadolu Spor Kulübü is a Turkish football club based in Üsküdar district of Istanbul. It was founded by Mehmed Bürhaneddin (Burhan Felek) and Dr. Hüdai in 1908. Their team colours are green and white. They are currently playing in Turkish Super Amateur League, Istanbul Group 3. They were groundsharing with Beylerbeyi SK at the Beylerbeyi 75. Yıl Stadium. They are currently playing at Spor Akademisi Stadium at Anadolu Hisarı. The club wants to use the Burhan Felek Stadium but the ground doesn't meet the professional football regulations.

Defunct branches
Wrestling, handball and athletics.

Honours
Istanbul Football League:
Runner-up: 1914–1915, 1916–1917

See also
List of Turkish Sports Clubs by Foundation Dates

External links
Club profile at TFF Istanbul Provincial Representative

References
 Anadolu Spor Kulübü. Türk Futbol Tarihi vol.1. page(23). (June 1992) Türkiye Futbol Federasyonu Yayınları.

Anadolu Üsküdar 1908
Association football clubs established in 1908
1908 establishments in the Ottoman Empire